

Stoke d'Abernon is a village and former civil parish in the borough of Elmbridge in Surrey, England. It is on the right bank of the River Mole contiguously south of Cobham, a larger settlement which is a post town and is east-southeast of Oxshott a large village founded in the 19th century from the higher, sandy forested part of its formerly expansive area.  It shares a railway station with Cobham and is inside the M25 motorway. Cobham Training Centre, the training ground of Chelsea F.C., is within its traditional boundaries.

History

Stoke D'Abernon appears in Domesday Book of 1086 as the manor of Stoche (derived from the common Anglo-Saxon word stoc, implying a holy place). Its assets were: 2 hides, 2 virgates and 5 acres (making about 1.11 km2 in all); 1 church, 2 mills worth 13s, 4 ploughs, 6 oxen,  of meadow, woodland worth 40 hogs. It rendered £5 per year to its feudal system overlords.

During the reign of Edward the Confessor, the manor was held by his servant, Bricsi Cild. Following the Norman conquest of England in 1066, William the Conqueror granted the manor to his kinsman, Richard fitz Gilbert, who also received the lordship of Clare.

The suffix "D'Abernon" comes from the surname of another Norman nobleman, Sir Roger D'Aubernoun, who was also granted land in Surrey in return for his services to William. At some point after 1086, the de Clare family granted the manor of Stoche to the D'Aubernoun family, who held it until the mid-14th century. Two descendants of Sir Roger, Sir John D'Aubernoun the Elder (died 1277) and his son Sir John the Younger (died 1327) are buried in the village; there are monumental brasses of them in St Mary's Church, with the one of Sir John the Elder believed to be the oldest in England.

Until the mid-19th century, Stoke D'Abernon lay in the hundred of Elmbridge, which gave its name to the modern-day borough. Today, the village forms part of the Oxshott & Stoke D'Abernon ward of the borough.

Amenities and landmarks
It has a railway station, named Cobham & Stoke D'Abernon to attract custom from the much larger village of Cobham which starts contiguously  to the north. It has been so named since its 1885 opening.

In the east, on the main road to Leatherhead, is the Woodlands Park Hotel, the top of which is tile-hung in the Surrey style. A single-storey bay has a terracotta balustrade above, and the building has a half-timbered gable end front bay. Built in 1890, it is a relatively modern listed building, designed by Rowland Plumbe. The local pub-restaurant is The Old Plough which dates to the 16th century.

The village has an active residents' association with a network of road representatives, but like those of neighbouring Cobham and Oxshott, and unlike similar groups in the rest of Elmbridge, it does not contest elections.

The church, St Mary's, is Saxon with Norman and Victorian additions, and is famous for its monumental brasses, among them the oldest in the country. It is still active, and is Grade I listed.

Sports
Since about 2006 the village has been home to the training ground of Premier League football club Chelsea.

Stoke D'Abernon Cricket Club was formed in 1870 and currently plays in the Surrey Championship.

Education

Parkside Preparatory School is an independent prep school at the grade II* listed manor house adjacent to the parish church of St. Mary and was founded in 1879.

Administration
The Surrey County Councillor is shared with Cobham.

Notable people
William Marshal, who was regent of England (1217–1219) and first 'Lord Marshal', spent his honeymoon here in the summer of 1189 with his new wife, Isabelle de Clare. His descendant the Earl Marshal is one of two hereditary peers (the other being the Lord Great Chamberlain) not subject to an election and entitled to sit in the House of Lords, while the hundreds of other hereditary peers compete for 90 places in the chamber at the death of any of the 90.

Yehudi Menuhin (whose full title was Baron Menuhin of Stoke D'Abernon in the County of Surrey) founded his music school to the south of the village.

The distinguished diplomat Edgar Vincent (1857–1941) lived within the parish in the early 20th century and was the first recipient of the D'Abernon Viscountcy and Barony. The title died with its first holder.

The England Test cricketer and captain, Bob Willis, grew up in the village and learnt to play at several local village clubs, including Stoke D'Abernon cricket club, before his professional career in the 1970s and 80s.

Demography and housing

The average level of accommodation in the region composed of detached houses was 28%, the average that was apartments was 22.6%.

The proportion of households in the settlement who owned their home outright compares to the regional average of 35.1%. The proportion who owned their home with a loan compares to the regional average of 32.5%. The remaining % is made up of rented dwellings (plus a negligible % of households living rent-free).

Gallery

See also
 Yehudi Menuhin, Baron Menuhin of Stoke D'Abernon in the County of Surrey

Notes and references
Notes 

References

External links

Stoke D'Abernon Residents' Association
Councillors for Oxshott & Stoke D'Abernon
St Mary's Church
Stoke D'Abernon Cricket Club

Villages in Surrey
Former civil parishes in Surrey
Borough of Elmbridge